The Rolandas Kalinauskas RK-6 Magic (or Magija) is a Lithuanian ultralight aircraft, designed and produced by Rolandas Kalinauskas, of Prienai. The aircraft is supplied as a complete ready-to-fly-aircraft.

Design and development
The RK-6 was designed to comply with the Fédération Aéronautique Internationale microlight rules. It features a strut-braced high wing, a tandem two-seat enclosed cockpit under a bubble canopy, fixed tricycle landing gear and a single engine in pusher configuration.

The aircraft forward fuselage is made from welded steel with a wooden laminate covering in the cockpit area, with the tailboom made from aluminum tube. The tail surfaces are built up from aluminum tubing, strut-braced and covered in Dacron sailcloth. The wings are wooden, produced by Arvydas Vaicekauskas and equipped with Junkers-style flaperons with flap deflections of 20 and 40 degrees. The standard engine available is the  Rotax 582 two-stroke powerplant. The aircraft can be flown without the canopy fitted, if desired.

Specifications (RK-6 Magic)

References

External links

2000s Lithuanian ultralight aircraft
Single-engined pusher aircraft